Robert Ligon McWhorter (June 4, 1891 – June 29, 1960) played football and baseball at the University of Georgia.

Early years
McWhorter attended Gordon Military College in Barnesville, Georgia. He played football and baseball there under coach Alex Cunningham. Their baseball team came up to Georgia and won 11–0. Georgia athletic chairman Dr. S. V. Sanford hired Cunningham that same day, and McWhorter followed.

University of Georgia

Football
As a halfback, he scored 61 touchdowns from 1910 to 1913.  In 1913, McWhorter became UGA’s first All-American.  He was the captain of both the baseball and football teams in his senior year. He was a member of the Chi Phi Fraternity, Phi Kappa Literary Society, and Phi Beta Kappa at Georgia.  Sportswriter Dick Jemison said "When you mention football to an Athens fan its definition is Bob McWhorter, and vice-versa."

During the First World War, McWhorter was captain of the 1917 Camp Gordon football team.

Legacy
He made an all-time Georgia Bulldogs football team picked in 1935. Bob McWhorter was inducted into the College Football Hall of Fame in 1954.  He was inducted in the Georgia Sports Hall of Fame in 1964. McWhorter was chosen for an Associated Press Southeast Area All-Time football team 1869–1919 era.

Baseball

Although he was offered a professional baseball contract, he instead chose to study law at the University of Virginia.

Attorney
After becoming an attorney, he returned to Athens, Georgia to practice law.  He was a four-term mayor of Athens (1940–1947) and a law professor at Georgia from 1923 to 1958.  He died in the same town in which he was born, Athens, Georgia, on June 29, 1960, at the age of 69.

References

External links
 

1891 births
1960 deaths
20th-century American lawyers
20th-century American politicians
Camp Gordon football players
Georgia Bulldogs baseball players
Georgia Bulldogs football players
All-Southern college football players
College Football Hall of Fame inductees
Georgia (U.S. state) lawyers
Mayors of places in Georgia (U.S. state)
University of Georgia faculty
University of Virginia School of Law alumni
Sportspeople from Athens, Georgia
Players of American football from Georgia (U.S. state)
Baseball players from Georgia (U.S. state)